Arra or ARRA may refer to:

Places
 Arra, Paschim Bardhaman, census town in West Bengal
 Arra, Purba Bardhaman, West Bengal
 Arra, Purulia, census town in West Bengal
 Arra, Chakwal, a village in Pakistan
 Arra, now part of Owney and Arra, County Tipperary, Ireland
 Arra Mountains, County Tipperary, Ireland

Other uses
 Ajman Real Estate Regulatory Agency, of Ajman, United Arab Emirates 
 American Recovery and Reinvestment Act of 2009
 ARRA (computer), the first Dutch computer
 Arra, extraterrestrial from the Space: 1999 episode "Collision Course".
Arra legalovi, an extinct species of beetle in the family Salpingidae.

People with the name
Nikolin Arra (born 1991), Albanian basketball player

See also 
 Ara (disambiguation)
 ARA (disambiguation)